José María "Chema" Antón Samper (born 19 March 1989) is a Spanish professional footballer who plays as a left back.

Club career
Born in Casas del Señor, Valencian Community, Antón joined Real Madrid's youth system in 2003, aged 14. Four years later he made his senior debut, spending three full seasons with the B-team in Segunda División B.

Without actually appearing in La Liga, Antón was an unused substitute in Bernd Schuster's last game in charge of the first team, a 3–4 home loss against Sevilla FC on 7 December 2008. The following match, a 0–2 defeat at FC Barcelona in Juande Ramos' debut, he was again on the bench.

On 28 July 2010, Antón moved to Real Betis, spending his first and only season in Andalusia with the reserves also in the third level. In the summer of 2011 he had a trial with FC Red Bull Salzburg, signing shortly after and joining Hungarian top flight club Újpest FC the following year.

Antón signed for UB Conquense on 30 January 2015, receiving the international clearance seven days later. He continued competing in division three in the following years, with CD Guijuelo and CD Eldense.

On 28 March 2017, Antón agreed to a one-year contract at Seinäjoen Jalkapallokerho in the Finnish Veikkausliiga.

Honours
Újpest
Magyar Kupa: 2013–14

References

External links

1989 births
Living people
People from Vinalopó Mitjà
Sportspeople from the Province of Alicante
Spanish footballers
Footballers from the Valencian Community
Association football defenders
Segunda División B players
Real Madrid Castilla footballers
Betis Deportivo Balompié footballers
UB Conquense footballers
CD Guijuelo footballers
CD Eldense footballers
Austrian Football Bundesliga players
FC Red Bull Salzburg players
Nemzeti Bajnokság I players
Újpest FC players
Veikkausliiga players
Seinäjoen Jalkapallokerho players
Spain youth international footballers
Spanish expatriate footballers
Expatriate footballers in Austria
Expatriate footballers in Hungary
Expatriate footballers in Finland
Spanish expatriate sportspeople in Austria
Spanish expatriate sportspeople in Hungary